Northfield was a town in Richmond County, New York. It was incorporated in 1788 as one of the four original towns of Staten Island. It was dissolved in 1898 upon consolidation into the City of New York.

See also
 List of Staten Island neighborhoods
 List of former municipalities in New York City

References

Geography of Staten Island
History of Staten Island
Former towns in New York City